Austin Aztex FC was an American soccer club based in Austin, Texas that was founded in 2008 by Phil Rawlins, a British entrepreneur. The Aztex began playing competitive soccer in the United Soccer Leagues (USL) First Division in the 2009 season and shared an affiliation agreement with Rawlins' hometown club, Stoke City, enabling the two clubs to exchange players and the English club to scout players and hold training camps in the US.  Austin's first USL match was against the Minnesota Thunder on April 18, 2009.  In the 2010 season, the team played its home games at House Park, which replaced Nelson Field as the club's home facility, and competed in the USSF Division 2 Professional League, a temporary league set up by the United States Soccer Federation (USSF) to resolve a dispute between the USL and the proposed new North American Soccer League.  The franchise relocated to Florida and became Orlando City SC at the conclusion of the 2010 season.

Forty-nine players participated in at least one league match for the Aztex.  This total consists of forty-five outfield players and four goalkeepers.  Eddie Johnson holds the records for the most appearances and goals for the club, having played fifty times and scored twenty goals.

Players
Players who were contracted to the club but never played a USL game are not listed.  All statistics are for USL regular season games only.

Key

By nationality
Seventeen players from outside the United States played in the USL for the Aztex.

References

Austin Aztex
 
Association football player non-biographical articles